The MacBook is a line of Mac laptops sold by Apple Inc. between May 2006 and February 2012. It replaced the iBook series of notebooks as a part of Apple's transition from PowerPC to Intel processors. Positioned as the low end of the MacBook family, below the premium ultra-portable MacBook Air and the performance-oriented MacBook Pro,  the MacBook was aimed at the consumer and education markets. It became the best-selling Mac in Apple's history. For five months in 2008, it was the best-selling laptop of any brand in US retail stores.

There have been three separate designs of the original MacBook. The original design used a combination of polycarbonate and fiberglass casing which was modeled after the iBook G4. The second design, introduced in October 2008 alongside the 15-inch MacBook Pro, shared the latter's unibody aluminium casing, but lacked a FireWire port. A third design, introduced in late 2009, retained a similar unibody construction but changed back to white polycarbonate.

On July 20, 2011, the MacBook was discontinued for consumer purchase as it had been effectively superseded by the MacBook Air which had a lower entry price.  Apple continued to sell the MacBook to educational institutions until February 2012. A new line of computers by the same name was released in 2015, serving the same purpose as an entry-level laptop.

Polycarbonate (2006–2009) 

The original MacBook, available in black or white colors, was released on May 16, 2006, and used the Intel Core Duo processor and 945GM chipset, with Intel's GMA 950 integrated graphics on a 667 MHz front side bus. Later revisions of the MacBook moved to the Core 2 Duo processor and the GM965 chipset, with Intel's GMA X3100 integrated graphics on an 800 MHz system bus. Sales of the black polycarbonate MacBook ceased in October 2008, after the introduction of the aluminum MacBook, however the white model continued to be sold until the introduction of the redesigned unibody polycarbonate MacBook.

While thinner than its predecessor – the iBook G4 – the MacBook is wider than the 12-inch model due to its widescreen display. In addition, the MacBook was one of the first (the first being the MacBook Pro) to adopt Apple's MagSafe power connector and it replaced the iBook's mini-VGA display port with a mini-DVI display port. The iBook's discrete graphics chip was initially replaced by an integrated Intel GMA solution, though the latest revisions of the MacBook were upgraded with the more powerful Nvidia GeForce 9400M and later the 320M.

While the MacBook Pro largely followed the industrial design standard set by the PowerBook G4, the MacBook was Apple's first notebook to use features now standard in its notebooks – the glossy display, the sunken keyboard design and the non-mechanical magnetic latch. With the late 2007 revision, the keyboard received several changes to closely mirror the one which shipped with the iMac, by adding the same keyboard shortcuts to control multimedia, and removing the embedded numeric keypad and the Apple logo from the command keys.

A more expensive black model, with a larger capacity hard drive, was offered until the introduction of the unibody aluminum MacBook. The polycarbonate MacBook was the only Macintosh notebook (until the new 2015 model) to be offered in more than one color since the iBook G3 (Clamshell). The MacBook was Apple's second black notebook, after the PowerBook G3.

Ports 
The ports are all on the left edge; on early models, from left to right, they are the MagSafe power connector, Gigabit Ethernet, mini-DVI, FireWire 400, 2 USB 2.0 ports, audio in, audio out and Kensington Security Slot.

For the unibody polycarbonate MacBook (2009), the ports from left to right are the MagSafe power connector, Gigabit Ethernet, Mini DisplayPort, 2 USB 2.0 ports, audio out and Kensington Security Slot.

On the front, there is a power light and an infrared receiver, while on the right edge, there is only the optical drive.

User serviceability 
The polycarbonate Intel MacBook is easier for users to fix or upgrade than its predecessor. Where the iBook required substantial disassembly to access internal components such as the hard drive, users only need to remove the battery and the RAM door to access or replace the internal hard disk drive. Apple provides do-it-yourself manuals for these tasks.

Quality problems 
In February 2007, the MacBook was recalled because the graphics card and hard drive caused the computer to overheat, forcing the unit to shut down.

Some early polycarbonate MacBook models suffered from random shutdowns; Apple released a firmware update to resolve them.

There were also cases reported of discolored or chipping palmrests. In such cases, Apple asked affected owners to contact AppleCare.

There were problems with batteries on some models from 2007 not being read by the MacBook. This is caused by a logic board fault and not a fault with the battery.

In February 2010, Apple announced a recall for MacBooks bought between 2006 and 2007 for hard drive issues. This is caused by heat and other problems.

Technical specifications 
Apple used the A1181 code, printed on the case, for this family of models, though 17 variations may be counted if color is included.

All are obsolete.

Aluminum Unibody (2008) 

On October 14, 2008, Apple announced a MacBook featuring a new Nvidia chipset at a Cupertino, California press conference with the tagline: "The spotlight turns to notebooks". It was replaced by the 13-inch MacBook Pro the following year.

The chipset brought a 1066 MHz system bus, use of DDR3 system memory, and integrated Nvidia GeForce 9400M graphics. Other changes include a display which uses LED backlights (replacing the fluorescent tube backlights used in the previous model) and arsenic-free glass, a new Mini DisplayPort (replacing the polycarbonate MacBook's mini-DVI port), a multi-touch glass trackpad which also acts as the mouse button, and the removal of the FireWire 400 port (thus it doesn't support Target Disk Mode, used for data transfers or operating system repairs without booting the system).

There was only one product cycle of the aluminum MacBook, as Apple rebranded the next revision in June 2009 as a 13-inch MacBook Pro using the same chassis with an added FireWire port and SD card slot.

Design 
The design had stylistic traits of the MacBook Air which were also implemented into the design of the MacBook Pro. This model is thinner than the original polycarbonate MacBooks, and it made use of a unibody aluminum case with tapered edges. The keyboard of the higher-end model included a backlight.

Reception 
Although Gizmodo concluded it to be "our favorite MacBook to date," they did claim, at this time, its display was inferior to that found on the MacBook Pro and MacBook Air, alleging a smaller viewing angle, washed-out colors, and dimmer backlighting. Similarly, AppleInsider and Engadget concluded it "may well be Apple's best MacBook to date" and "these are terrific choices—not only from an industrial design standpoint, but in specs as well" respectively, while also drawing attention to a lower quality display as compared with the MacBook Pro and MacBook Air. Charlie Sorrel of Wired News reached a similar conclusion about the MacBook display, citing its poor contrast and lack of vertical angle in comparison with the MacBook Pro and even the older white MacBook. Peter Cohen wrote an article discussing the loss of the FireWire port for Macworld, saying "The absence of FireWire ports is certainly an inconvenience for some users. But it shouldn’t be considered a deal-breaker for most of us, anyway."

Technical specifications 

All are obsolete.

Polycarbonate Unibody (2009–2010) 

On October 20, 2009, Apple released a MacBook that introduced a new polycarbonate (plastic) unibody design, faster DDR3 memory, a multi-touch trackpad, an LED-backlit display, and a built-in seven-hour battery. The polycarbonate unibody MacBook, like its aluminum predecessor, lacks FireWire and, like the 13-inch MacBook Pro, has a combined audio in/out port. There is no infrared port and the Apple Remote is not included. On May 18, 2010, the MacBook was refreshed with a faster processor, a faster graphics card, improved battery life, and the ability to pass audio through the Mini DisplayPort connector. On July 20, 2011, the MacBook was discontinued for consumer purchases, but was still available to educational institutions until February 2012. It was the last Mac to use a plastic shell, as every Mac since has used aluminum.

Design 
Unlike the MacBook Air, the MacBook follows the same design first seen in the MacBook Pro; however, it is rounder on the edges than previous laptops in the MacBook line. This model has an all-white fingerprint-resistant glossy palm rest, unlike the grayish surface of its predecessor, and uses a multi-touch glass trackpad like the one found on the MacBook Pro. The video-out port is Mini DisplayPort. The bottom of the MacBook features a rubberized non-slip finish. This was prone to peeling off and Apple offered free replacements fitted by authorised agents until at least 2015 internationally. The built-in battery of the late 2009 revision, a feature introduced earlier in the year with the MacBook Pro, is claimed by Apple to last seven hours compared with five hours in the older models. However, in tests conducted by Macworld, the battery was found to last only about four hours while playing video at full brightness with AirPort turned off. However, Apple's battery life was calculated with the brightness at the middle setting and while browsing websites and editing word documents, not with video and at full brightness. Gizmodo also reached about the same conclusion in their tests, but with AirPort turned on. The battery included in the mid-2010 model holds an additional five watt-hours over the previous model's and is claimed to last up to ten hours.

Reception 
Despite being hailed by Slashgear as "one of the best entry-level notebooks Apple have produced," the unibody MacBook has received criticism for its lack of a FireWire port and SD card slot. Nilay Patel of Engadget added that the USB ports were easily dented and the bottom of the laptop became worn and discolored after a few days. He also drew particular attention to the fact that the price was not lowered, stating the small price difference between the MacBook and the MacBook Pro makes it a "wasted pricing opportunity." However, most critics agree that the unibody MacBook's display is significantly better than its predecessor's. AppleInsider states the new display "delivers significantly better color and viewing angle performance" than the previous MacBook, but still "not as vivid and wide-angle viewable as the MacBook Pro screens."

Technical specifications 
Models of the Macbook A1342 family

All are obsolete.

Criticisms and defects 
The rubber bottom of unibody MacBooks have been known to peel off.  Apple has noticed this as a flaw and will replace the bottom for free, with or without a warranty. Some consumers have also reported defects in their LCD displays in mid-2010–2011 models.

The MagSafe power adapter of MacBooks has been known to fray, break, and stop working. Following a lawsuit, Apple replaces these adapters for US residents with affected adapters, purchased (or received as a gift) with computers or as an accessory.

Some MacBooks are affected by the iSeeYou vulnerability, potentially allowing their iSight cameras to record the user without the user's knowledge.

Supported operating systems

Timeline

See also 
MacBook
MacBook (2015–2019)
MacBook Air
MacBook Pro

Notes

References

External links 

MacBook Developer Note
MacBook Buyer's Guide
Another Blog all about the Macbook with diagrams

2006-2012
Computer-related introductions in 2006
X86 Macintosh computers
Products and services discontinued in 2012
Discontinued Apple Inc. products